Home Front is an interior design "makeover" TV show airing on the BBC, on par with American television's This Old House and Martha Stewart. The programme appeared in two formats.

The original format was a half-hour show hosted by Tessa Shaw, which ran c.1992-1997 and featured numerous different designers giving advice on DIY projects.

The second was an hour-long makeover show presented by Laurence Llewelyn-Bowen and Diarmuid Gavin. The seasons 1996-2000 (and also the seasons 1997-2000 of Home Front in the Garden) were hosted by Anne McKevitt. This version originally aired concurrently with the original format as a spin-off titled Home Front Inside Out, but took on the title of the parent programme when the original format was axed.

A variant titled Home Front in the Garden also aired, hosted by Shaw and featuring Diarmuid Gavin and Kevin McCloud.

References

External links

1994 British television series debuts
2005 British television series endings
BBC Television shows
English-language television shows